<onlyinclude>

December 2020

See also

References 

killings by law enforcement officers
 12